STPI - Creative Workshop & Gallery, Singapore (formerly known as Singapore Tyler Print Institute) is a creative workshop and contemporary art gallery based in Singapore that specialises in artistic experimentation in the medium of print and paper. To date, STPI has collaborated with over 90 artists from all over the world.

Situated in a restored 19th century warehouse by the Singapore River at Robertson Quay, the 4,000-square metre facility houses specialised printmaking presses and equipment, a paper mill, 400-square metre gallery, guest workshop, artist studio, artist apartments, staff offices and The Corner Shop.

STPI sits alongside National Gallery Singapore and the Singapore Art Museum as part of the national Visual Arts Cluster of leading institutions in the region. STPI is also a member of the Art Galleries Association of Singapore (AGAS), a non-profit organisation that represents the interests of gallery owners and operators in Singapore.

S.E.A. Focus is a showcase of contemporary art from Southeast Asia, an initiative led by STPI since its inaugural edition in 2019.

History
STPI is a not-for-profit organisation established with the support of the Ministry of Information, Communication and the Arts (presently known as the Ministry of Culture, Community and Youth – MCCY), Singapore Tourism Board, and Singapore Totalisator Board, in line with the government’s Renaissance City Plan to position the nation as the prime arts hub of Southeast Asia.

The concept of establishing a large print workshop and paper mill in Singapore was first proposed in the mid-1990s to Kenneth E. Tyler, a long-standing American innovator, printer and publisher of fine art prints. On 10 April 2002, STPI was officially opened by Singapore's Deputy Prime Minister and Minister for Defence at the time, Dr. Tony Tan. Welcomed as an opportunity with long-term benefits that would add to the growth of the nation’s reputation as a City for the Arts, Singapore was seen as the ideal place for facilitating the amalgamation of Eastern and Western printmaking techniques, papermaking methods and various artistic practices.

Mission
STPI seeks to help develop Singapore as a leading player in the global contemporary art world by collaborating with top international artists. Through its artist collaborations, artworks, exhibitions and public programmes, STPI engages the international art community, collectors and the Singapore public with the aim of developing an appreciation of the print and paper art practice.

Artist collaborations
Artist collaborations lie at the heart of STPI’s programmes. Visiting artists live in the guest apartments at STPI, with access to the artist’s studio and workshop. They are also invited to give public talks to introduce their practice and studio work, and share their collaboration experience. At the end of each collaboration, works produced are exhibited and catalogued for public appreciation and sale.

 Aaron Curry (2018)
 Adeline Kueh (2021)
 Agus Swage (2009)
 Ahmad Zakii Anwar (2005)
 Alfredo and Isabel Aquilizan (2017, 2022)
 Amanda Heng (2017, 2021)
 Anri Sala (2017, 2020)
 Ashley Bickerton (2006, 2014, 2016, 2020)
 Atul Dodiya (2006)
 BenCab (2006, 2011)
 Brent Harris (2005)
 Carsten Holler (2017)
 Chang Fee Ming (2009)
 Charles Lim Yi Yong (2021)
 Christine Ay Tjoe (2006, 2009)
 Chua Ek Kay (2007, 2010)
 Chun Kwang-Yong (2006, 2009)
 David Chan (2009)
 Dinh Q. Lê (2018, 2020)
 Do Ho Suh (2015, 2016, 2022)
 Donald Sultan (2004)
 Donna Ong (2009)
 Eko Nugroho (2013, 2016, 2020, 2021)

 Entang Wiharso (2015, 2020, 2021)
 Eric Chan (2007)
 Genevieve Chua (2011, 2020, 2021, 2022)
 Geraldine Javier (2012)
 Ghada Amer (2008, 2021)
 Goh Beng Kwan (2007, 2020, 2022)
 Haegue Yang (2013, 2016, 2021)
 Han Sai Por (2014, 2016, 2022)
 Handiwirman Saputra (2012, 2016, 2021, 2022)
 Hema Upadhyay (2008, 2014,2020, 2021)
 Heman Chong (2007, 2014, 2021)
 Heri Dono (2016, 2020, 2021)
 Hong Zhu An (2012, 2014, 2020, 2022)
 Ian Woo (2021)
 Inga Svala Thorsdottir (2014, 2016, 2020)
 Jane Lee (2016, 2021)
 Jason Lim (2021)
 Jason Martin (2015, 2019, 2020)
 Jimmy Ong (2010)
 Jorinde Voigt (2015)
 Jumaldi Alfi (2011, 2021)
 Kim Beom (2017, 2021)

 Kim Lim (2020)
 Lieko Shiga (2007)
 Lin Tian Miao (2007, 2014, 2021)
 Lyra Garcellano (2011)
 Manuel Ocampo (2019, 2020, 2021)
 Melati Suryodarmo (2019, 2021, 2022)
 Nataraj Sharma (2007)
 Natee Utarit (2007)
 Ong Kim Seng (2004)
 Pacita Abad (2003)
 Pae White (2021)
 Phunk Studio (2009)
 Pinaree Sanpitak (2019, 2020, 2021)
 Prabhavathi Meppayil (2021)
 Qiu Zhijie (2008, 2014, 2020)
 R.E. Hartanto (2011)
 Reza Farkhondeh (2008, 2021)
 Richard Deacon (2012, 2014, 2015, 2016, 2020)
 Rirkrit Tiravanija (2014, 2017, 2020, 2022)
 Ronald Ventura (2014, 2017, 2020, 2022)
 Russel Wong (2005, 2021)
 Ryan Gander (2015, 2016)

 Shambhavi Singh (2011, 2016, 2020, 2021)
 Shinro Ohtake (2016, 2020)
 Shirazeh Houshiary (2015, 2016, 2020, 2021)
 Soo Pieng (2019)
 Srihardi Soedarsono (2005, 2021)
 Sun Xinping (2006)
 Sun Xun (2014)
 Sunaryo Soetono (2008, 2021)
 Suzann Victor (2015, 2016, 2020, 2021)
 Tabaimo (2010)
 Takashi Murakami (2019)
 Teppei Kaneuji (2014, 2016, 2020, 2022)
 Teresita Fernandez (2011)
 Thukral & Tagra (2011, 2014, 2021)
 Tobias Rehberger (2017)
 Trenton Doyle Hancock (2010)
 Wilson Shieh (2009)
 Wu Shanzhuan (2014, 2016, 2020)
 Yim Ja-Hyuk (2007, 2022)
 Zhan Wang (2012)
 Zhu Wei (2005, 2014)
 Zul Mahmod (2021)

STPI Gallery 
STPI Gallery hosts exhibitions of works produced in the Creative Workshop and regularly participates in local and international art fairs.

Programmes offered
The gallery holds 6-8 exhibitions a year, following successive artist collaborations, artist talks, panel discussions, regular docent-led tours, film screenings, performances and coffee & conversations.

Education and outreach
STPI organises print and papermaking workshops, guided tours, and an annual open house.

Annual special exhibitions
The annual special exhibition is a yearly segment that showcases works from the Singapore Art Museum Collection that were previously under the ownership of Kenneth E. Tyler, as well as various private collections and artist estates.

Friends of STPI
This membership programme was launched in September 2015. It aims to draw a closer connection between avid art lovers with artists and fellow collectors. Members are entitled to exclusive artist studio visits, VIP previews, overseas trips, and artist dinners.

Art fairs
Art fair participations include: S.E.A. Focus (Singapore), Art Stage Singapore (Singapore), Art Basel (Basel, Hong Kong and Miami Beach), The Armory Show (New York), FIAC Paris (Paris), Frieze Art Fair (London, Seoul), IFPDA Fine Art Print Fair (New York), Art Fair Philippines (Philippines), Korean International Art Fair (South Korea), Art Paris Art Fair (Paris), Print Basel (Basel), Pulse (New York) and SH Contemporary (Shanghai).

Biennales

Other projects
Hermes ALOFT, Platform STPI Projects, collaborations with international contemporary art galleries, for example, Neugerimschneider, Lisson Gallery, Lehmann Maupin, and Victoria Miro.

Notable acquisitions
Works produced at STPI have been included in collections such as the Museum of Modern Art (MoMA), New York; Philadelphia Museum of Art; Mori Art Museum, Tokyo; Bennesse Foundation, Japan; M+, Hong Kong; QAGOMA, Australia; Sherman Contemporary Art Foundation, Australia; Monash University Museum of Art, Australia; OHD Museum of Modern & Contemporary Indonesian Art, Indonesia; National Gallery Singapore and the Singapore Art Museum, amongst others.

STPI Creative Workshop
The STPI Creative Workshop comprises specialised facilities such as industry-grade print presses and a paper mill, as well as a team of print and papermakers. 
Techniques offered include:
	Lithography
	Screen print
	Intaglio
	Relief print

Publications
Since 2002, STPI has produced its own catalogues following the end of each artist collaboration. The list of catalogues that STPI has produced to date are:

See also
Ministry of Information, Communication and the Arts
National Heritage Board (Singapore)
Singapore Tourism Board

References

External links 
 Official website

Art museums and galleries in Singapore
Art galleries established in 2002